Jacco Eltingh and Paul Haarhuis were the defending champions, but lost in the first round this year.

Bernd Karbacher and Andrei Olhovskiy won the title, defeating Byron Black and Brett Steven 2–6, 7–6, 6–1 in the final.

Seeds

  Jacco Eltingh /  Paul Haarhuis (first round)
  Sergio Casal /  Emilio Sánchez (semifinals)
  Karel Nováček /  Javier Sánchez (quarterfinals)
  Byron Black /  Brett Steven (final)

Draw

Draw

External links
 Draw

Men's Doubles